Devro plc is a multinational company with registered office in Moodiesburn, Chryston, United Kingdom which manufactures and distributes goods derived from collagen, principally sausage casings, a product in which it is the world leader. The firm also produces films, casings and other specialised collagen products for use in the health care and cosmetics industries. The company is listed on the London Stock Exchange.

History
Devro was founded as a new business of Johnson & Johnson in 1950s after its researchers developed a material suitable for the manufacture of sausage casings from collagen. The business name was devised as an acronym of "Development and Research Organisation", the Johnson & Johnson unit from which it emerged.

The firm was subject to a £108 million management buyout from J&J in 1991 and was listed on the London Stock Exchange two years later. In 1996 it acquired the American firm Teepak International for US$135 million, including its majority stake in the Czech company Cutisin. The Czech unit was fully acquired in 2004.

Devro sold its cellulose business in 2000 for £4.8m, which resulted in a massive exceptional loss of £54.5m.

In early 2007 Devro engaged in talks with an undisclosed suitor, rumoured to be its then-largest shareholder Acomita Investment (a vehicle controlled by John Magnier), over a takeover of the company. The talks were however terminated after an agreement could not be reached on issues relating to its pension scheme.

The company was promoted to the FTSE 250 Index on 27 August 2010 after the acquisition of Arriva by Deutsche Bahn was completed.

In late 2015, Devro acquired PVI Industries, a Dutch-based collagen manufacturer, in a £10m deal.

Peter Page stepped down as Chief Executive on 28 February 2018, after almost 11 years in the position. He is widely credited in managing the company's turnaround. Peter was replaced by Rutger Helbing, the company's former Finance Director.

Operations

Some 1,450 of Devro's 2,200 employees are based in Europe, with the majority of these at manufacturing and research and development facilities in Jilemnice and Slavkov in the Czech Republic. Devro headquarters are in Moodiesburn, Scotland.

The company's largest manufacturing site by volume is also the newest, in Nantong, China, other manufacturing and technical plants are located in Jilemnice, Czech republic, Sandy Run, South Carolina in the United States and Bathurst, New South Wales in Australia. The firm also has sales offices in Germany, Russia, Hong Kong, Japan and New Zealand.

References

External links

Devro Select Website

Food and drink companies established in 1950
Food manufacturers of the United Kingdom
Companies formed by management buyout
1950 establishments in England
1993 initial public offerings